Pangaeus congruus is a species of burrowing bug in the family Cydnidae. It is found in Central America and North America.

References

Further reading

 
 
 
 
 
 
 

Cydnidae
Articles created by Qbugbot
Insects described in 1877